Blackburn is a constituency in Lancashire, England, which has been represented in the House of Commons of the UK Parliament since 2015 by Kate Hollern of the Labour Party. From 1979 to 2015, it was represented by Jack Straw who served under the Labour leaders of Neil Kinnock and John Smith and the Labour governments of Tony Blair and Gordon Brown.

Constituency profile
It has elected Labour MPs since its re-creation in 1955.

Boundaries

1832–1885: The township of Blackburn.

1885–1918: The existing parliamentary borough, and so much of the municipal borough of Blackburn as was not already included in the parliamentary borough.

1918–1950: the county borough of Blackburn.

1955–1974: The county borough of Blackburn wards of Park, St. John's, St. Jude's, St. Luke's, St. Matthew's, St. Michael's, St. Paul's, St. Silas's, St. Stephen's, St. Thomas's and Trinity.

The constituency encompasses the town of Blackburn in the North West of England. It borders four other constituencies: Ribble Valley to the north, Hyndburn to the east, Rossendale and Darwen to the south and Chorley to the west.

Following the review of parliamentary representation in Lancashire, including the unitary authority of Blackburn with Darwen in the run up to the 2010 United Kingdom general election the Boundary Commission for England made minor boundary changes to the existing constituency.

The electoral wards in the Blackburn seat fought at the UK general election in 2010 were entirely within the district of Blackburn with Darwen.
Audley, Bastwell, Beardwood and Lammack, Corporation Park, Ewood, Higher Croft, Little Harwood, Livesey with Pleasington, Meadowhead, Mill Hill, Queen's Park, Roe Lee, Shadsworth with Whitebirk, Shear Brow and Wensley Fold.

History
For more details, see the Politics section of the Blackburn article.

Blackburn was first enfranchised by the Reform Act 1832, as a two-member constituency, and was first used at the 1832 general election. It was abolished for the 1950 general election, replaced by two single member constituencies, Blackburn East and Blackburn West.

Blackburn was re-established as a single-member constituency for the 1955 general election, partially replacing Blackburn East and Blackburn West. After its re-establishment, the constituency was initially a marginal, but Blackburn is now considered to be a Labour Party stronghold.

It has been represented by two prominent frontbenchers in the Cabinet: Barbara Castle, a First Secretary of State (amongst other roles) who stood down from this seat to become a Member of the European Parliament, and Jack Straw, who served as Home Secretary and then Foreign Secretary in the Blair government.

2005 general election
Blackburn's then MP, Straw, was primarily challenged in the 2005 general election by the Conservative Party, but the former British ambassador to Uzbekistan, Craig Murray, also stood for election in the seat as an Independent. Murray said: "I've been approached by several people in the Asian community who are under huge pressure from Labour activists [talking up the BNP's chances] to apply for a postal vote rather than a ballot vote and then hand their postal vote over to the Labour party." Over 50% more people used postal votes in the 2005 general election in Blackburn than in 2001. The BNP had not stood in the previous two elections, but this time had a candidate, who polled 5.4% of the vote, and beat Murray to come fourth. Both were outperformed by the Liberal Democrats in third place, and the Conservatives, who remained second. Straw held on comfortably, albeit with a reduced majority; his winning share of 42% is the smallest since the seat became a single-member constituency.

2015 general election
In August 2011, Straw announced he had no plans to retire, despite hitting 65 earlier that month.

On 25 October 2013, Straw announced that he would stand down as Blackburn's MP at the next election. In March 2014, Kate Hollern was selected, via an all women shortlist, as the candidate for Labour for the 2015 general election, and held the seat.

Members of Parliament

Two-member constituency (1832–1950)

Single member constituency (1955–present)

Elections

Elections in the 2010s

Elections in the 2000s

Elections in the 1990s

Elections in the 1980s

Elections in the 1970s

Elections in the 1960s

Elections in the 1950s

Back to elections

Elections in the 1940s 

General Election 1939–40:
Another General Election was required to take place before the end of 1940. The political parties had been making preparations for an election to take place from 1939 and by the end of this year, the following candidates had been selected; 
Conservative: W. D. Smiles, George Elliston 
Labour: James Bell, William John Tout
Back to elections

Elections in the 1930s 

Back to elections

Elections in the 1920s 

Back to elections

Elections in the 1910s 

Back to elections

Elections in the 1900s

Back to elections

Elections in the 1890s

Back to elections

Elections in the 1880s

Back to elections

Elections in the 1870s 

 Caused by Feilden's death.

 

Back to elections

Elections in the 1860s 

 

 Caused by the 1868 election being declared void on petition after "undue influence by those who held the position of agents in the canvass".

 

 

 
 
 

Back to elections

Elections in the 1850s

 
 
 

 

 

 

 Caused by Eccles' election being declared void on petition, due to bribery.

 
  

 

 

Back to elections

Elections in the 1840s

 
   
  

 

 

 

 

 

Back to elections

Elections in the 1830s

 

 

 

 

 

 

 

 

Back to elections

See also
List of parliamentary constituencies in Lancashire
Blackburn East (UK Parliament constituency) 1950–1955
Blackburn West (UK Parliament constituency) 1950–1955

Notes

References

External links
nomis Constituency Profile
Blackburn Labour Party
Blackburn Liberal Democrats
Janis Sharp Campaign Site
Bushra Irfan Campaign Site

Parliamentary constituencies in North West England
Constituencies of the Parliament of the United Kingdom established in 1832
Constituencies of the Parliament of the United Kingdom disestablished in 1950
Constituencies of the Parliament of the United Kingdom established in 1955
Politics of Blackburn with Darwen